Soup with Risotto is a dish in Italian-American cuisine made with risotto, eggs, bread crumbs, and clear or brown soup. It is commonly made when one has risotto leftover after a meal. The risotto is made into little balls the size of small nuts. These are then covered in egg and bread crumbs and fried in butter.  After being dried they are added to either clear or brown soup.

Similar recipes in Italy are supplì and arancini, in which the balls are made (actually a little bigger than eggs), but they are not added to soup and are rather eaten on their own.

References 

American soups
Italian-American cuisine